Motte-and-bailey is a type of construction used in castles.

Motte may also refer to:

 La Motte (disambiguation), various places with this name
 Motte (film), a Malayalam film
 Motte (surname), various people with this name 
 Platzer Motte, a German parasol-wing aircraft design

See also
 Lamotte (disambiguation)
 Mote (disambiguation)
 Mott (disambiguation)
 Motte-and-bailey fallacy